Kryvyi Rih/Lozuvatka International Airport  is an airport near Kryvyi Rih, Ukraine. It is located 4.2 km (2.6 miles) west of the Lozuvatka rural community, and 17.5 km (10.9 Miles) northwest of the city of Kryvyi Rih.

History
From 2001, Kryvyi Rih International Airport is in the communal property of the city for the purpose of financial support. On 24 December 2003, the City Council decided to approve a program of financial support and development for KP Kryvyi Rih International Airport. The airport municipal company remained unprofitable as of January 2012.

In 2004, revenues from the enterprise core and supporting activities amounted up to 1m hryvn (almost 200 000 USD). Aircraft carried out internal flights to Lviv, Kyiv, and Donetsk and international flights to Istanbul, Anakena, Zagreb, Moscow, Thessaloniki, and other cities. They transported 5.7 thousand passengers and 46.9 tons of cargo.

Airlines and destinations
As of 8 October 2021, there are no scheduled routes at the airport, following the closure of the sole domestic service by Windrose Airlines to Kyiv–Boryspil.

Statistics

See also
 List of airports in Ukraine
 List of the busiest airports in Ukraine
 List of the busiest airports in Europe
 List of the busiest airports in the former USSR

References

External links
General Airport Information
Airline based in the airport

Transport in Kryvyi Rih
Airports in Ukraine
Buildings and structures in Dnipropetrovsk Oblast